East Robertson High School is a public high school in Cross Plains, Tennessee. It is one of five high schools managed by Robertson County Schools.

History
In 1950, two high schools in eastern Robertson County—Orlinda High School, located in Orlinda, and Cross Plains High School, located in Cross Plains—merged to form East Robertson High School, originally located on East Robertson Road. East Robertson High School became a K–12 school after the addition of new classrooms. On May 9, 1970, East Robertson's principal, Edwin H. Osborne, died from a heart attack at the age of 61.

In late 1990, grades 7–12 moved to East Robertson's present-day Kilgore Trace location, and the East Robertson Road location became an elementary school. In 2001, East Robertson High School opened several new middle school classrooms, allowing for sixth grade classes to take place. In 2005, Barry Baker, a teacher at East Robertson, died in a car accident. Following his death, the school's football field was renamed "Barry Baker Memorial Field" in his honor. Today, East Robertson High School accommodates grades 6–12.

Baseball field bullet incident
On May 13, 2013, during after-school baseball practice, a bullet struck the dugout while players were sitting on the bench. Police determined that the incident was an accident, with the bullet having been fired by a hunter about three miles away. No injuries occurred, and the team went on to the 2013 district championship.

Athletics
East Robertson has football, baseball, basketball, softball, soccer, and volleyball teams. The school plays in Region 4 of Division II A as of 2022.

A Class of 2022 alum, Taylor Groves, currently plays for the Ole Miss Rebels football team as a safety. As of November 2, 2022, he has one tackle in college football.

References

External links
 

1950 establishments in Tennessee
educational institutions established in 1950
public high schools in Tennessee
public middle schools in Tennessee
schools in Robertson County, Tennessee